Alois Müller (born 7 June 1890, date of death unknown) was an Austrian football player. He was born in Stockerau. He played for the Wiener Sport-Club, and also for the Austria national football team. He competed at the 1912 Summer Olympics in Stockholm.

References

External links

1890 births
Year of death unknown
People from Stockerau
Austrian footballers
Austria international footballers
Footballers at the 1912 Summer Olympics
Olympic footballers of Austria
Association football forwards
Footballers from Lower Austria
Wiener Sport-Club players